Moses Bensusan (born 30 December 1968) is a Moroccan-Canadian-American real estate developer. He is the CEO of Liberty Grande, LLC a real estate development company and CEO/President of Logictech Construction Group, LLC, a development and general contracting company, one of the top construction companies in the South Florida area.

Biography
Bensusan was born in Tangier, Morocco and raised in Spain. He migrated to South Florida in the United States in 2007.

Liberty Grande / Logictech 
Shortly after moving to Florida, Bensusan formed a real estate development company, Liberty Grande, LLC, in 2009.

In 2009, Bensusan's company acquired the Logictech Construction Group, a development and general contractor. Logictech was later named one of the top 25 construction companies in South Florida by South Florida Business Journal in 2012. The group now consists of a team of design and construction professionals. Bensusan serves as CEO of Liberty Grande and Logictech.

Costa Hollywood village
Bensusan, through his companies Liberty Grande and Logictech, acquired property for the development of a residential community, Costa Hollywood Village, in South Florida. The project broke ground in June 2013. Initially slated to be completed in 2016, the project will consist of over 307 condo resorts plus restaurants and other amenities. The community is located at 777 North Ocean Drive, Hollywood, Florida. 
The architect for the project is Hamed Rodriguez Architects and the construction is being undertaken by Liberty Grande, with general contractors Beauchamp Construction and Baker Concrete Construction.

References

External links
 Logictech Construction Group
 Costa Hollywood

1968 births
Canadian businesspeople
21st-century American businesspeople
Living people
20th-century Moroccan Jews
American people of Moroccan descent
Moroccan emigrants to Canada
People from Tangier